Mary Lee Hu (born 1943 in Lakewood, Ohio) is an American artist, goldsmith, and college level educator known for using textile techniques to create intricate woven wire jewelry.

Career
Hu first became fascinated with metalwork during high school introductory courses. She later explored more work with metals during a summer camp. She went on to attend Miami University in Oxford, Ohio, for two years and then went to Cranbrook Academy of Art in Bloomfield Hills, Michigan to complete her undergraduate degree. During her undergraduate education Hu developed her skills and continued to work with small scale metalwork and jewelry. In 1966 while earning her graduate degree in Metalsmithing from Southern Illinois University in Carbondale, Illinois, Hu studied under renowned metalsmith L. Brent Kington. It was during this time that Hu started to work with fiber inspired techniques after taking a fiber arts course. This led to the development of her signature style of wire wrapped jewelry. Since the late 1960s Hu has developed new techniques in coiling, wrapping, weaving, knitting, and twining wire. Her work consists mostly woven wire earrings, rings, bracelets, brooches, and neckpieces that emulate natural forms, movements and symmetry.

After completing her master of fine arts degree, Hu traveled to various places and took up different teaching positions until she joined the metal arts program in the University of Washington in the School of Art in 1980. She retired from the University of Washington as professor emeritus in 2006.

In 1996 Hu was inducted into the American Craft Council College of Fellows. Hu has received three National Endowment of the Arts Craftsman Fellowships. Her work is in major collections such as the Victoria and Albert Museum, the Renwick Gallery, the American Crafts Museum and the Art Institute of Chicago. Hu is the winner of the 2008 Irving and Yvonne Twining Humber Award for Lifetime Artistic Achievement.

Education

1965: B.F.A. Metalsmithing, Cranbrook Academy of Art, Bloomfield Hills, MI
1967: M.F.A. Metalsmithing, Southern Illinois University, Carbondale, IL

Teaching

1968-1969: Southern Illinois University
1976: University of Iowa 
1976:Kansas State University 
1976-1977: University of Wisconsin–Madison 
1977-1980: Michigan State University 
1980-2006: University of Washington

Awards and grants

1975: Best in Show, Best in Metals, Outstanding Craftsman of the North Central Region, Purchase Award, \"Beaux Arts Designer/Craftsman '75\", Columbus Museum of Fine Arts, Columbus, OH
1976: National Endowment for the Arts Crafts Fellowship
1978: All-University Research Grant, Michigan State University
1979: All-University Research Grant, Michigan State University
1984: National Endowment for the Arts Crafts Fellowship
1988: Alumni Achievement Award, Southern Illinois University-Carbondale
1992: National Endowment for the Arts Crafts Fellowship
1996: Appointed as a Fellow of the American Crafts Council
1999: Elected "Master of the Medium" for the James C. Renwick Alliance, the Renwick Gallery, Smithsonian, Washington, DC
2001-02: Flintridge Foundation Award for Visual Artists
2002 Donald E. Peterson Endowed Fellowship for Excellence, College of Arts and Sciences, University of Washington
2004: Invited to start a Mary Lee Hu research collection at The Archives of American Art, Smithsonian Institution, Washington, DC, part of the Nanette L. Laitman Documentation Project for Craft and Decorative Arts in America.
2008: The Irving and Yvonne Twining Humber Award for Lifetime Artistic Achievement from Artist Trust of Washington.

Public collections

Arkansas Arts Center, Little Rock, AR
The Metropolitan Museum of Art, New York City
Columbus Museum of Art, Columbus, OH
Illinois State University
Museum of Arts & Design (formerly American Crafts Museum), New York City
Renwick Gallery, National Museum of American Art, Washington DC
The Art Institute of Chicago, Chicago, IL
The Museum of Fine Arts, Boston
The Museum of Fine Arts, Houston
The Tacoma Art Museum, Tacoma, WA
The Victoria and Albert Museum, London, England
University of Indiana Art Gallery, Bloomington, IN
Yale University Art Gallery, New Haven, CT

Exhibitions
1967
 Crafts Alliance Gallery, St. Louis, MO

1969
 "Young Americans '69", Museum of Contemporary Crafts, New York, NY

1970–72
 "Goldsmith ‘70", Minnesota Museum of Art, St. Paul, MN

1974
 University of Iowa, Iowa City, IA
 "World Silver Fair", International competition, Taxco and Mexico City, Mexico
 "Profile 1974", Humber College, Rexdale, Etobicoke, Ontario, Canada

1974–77
 "Goldsmith/74", by the Renwick Gallery and the Minnesota Museum of Art.

1975
 "Contemporary Crafts of the Americas: 1975", Competitive exhibition, Colorado State University national tour
 "Beaux Arts designer/Craftsmen ‘75", Columbus Gallery of Fine Arts, Columbus, OH.

1975–76
 "Forms in Metal-275 Years of Metalsmithing in America", Museum of Contemporary Crafts, New York, NY

1976
 University of Wisconsin–Madison, Madison, WI
 "6 Contemporary American Jewellers", Electrum Gallery, London

1977
 Columbus Museum of Art, Columbus, OH
 Illinois State University, Normal, IL
 "Creative Jewelry", Design Center, Manila, Philippines

1978
 "Modern American Jewelry Exhibition", Mikimoto & Co., Tokyo
 "American Crafts at the Vatican Museum", Vatican City
 Goldsmith Hall, London (with Harper, Scherr, Seppa)

1978–82
 "Silver in American Life", Yale University Art Gallery

1979
 Eastern Kentucky University Gallery, Richmond, KY
 "Fourth International Jewellery Art Exhibition", Jewellery Designers Association, Mikimoto, Tokyo

1979–81

1980
 Pittsburgh Center for the Arts, Pittsburgh, PA
 "International Jewellery 1900-1980", Kunslerhaus, Vienna

1981
 University of North Dakota, Grand Forks, ND
 "Tenth anniversary Exhibition", Electrum Gallery, London, England
 "The Golden Thread-Textures in Gold", Touring International Competition

1981–85
 "Good as Gold: Alternative Materials in American Jewelry", Renwick Gallery, Smithsonian, Washington, DC, national tour

1982
 Middle Tennessee State University, Murfreesboro, TN

1983
 University of Louisiana, Lafayette, LA
 Invitational of American Jewelry, Kyoto Municipal Museum of Traditional Industry, Kyoto

1984
 The Hand and the Spirit Gallery, Scottsdale, AZ

1984–85
 "Jewelry USA", organized by the Museum of Art and Design, New York, NY, national tour

1985
 "Barbara Rockefeller Associates Collection", Anatole Orient Gallery, London, England
 "Masterworks of Contemporary American Jewelry: Sources and Concepts", The Victoria and Albert Museum, London, England
 "International Jewelry Invitational", Rudolf Dentler Gallery, Ulm, Germany

1985–87
 "American Jewelry NOW", Museum of Art and Design, New York, NY, Asia tour

1986–88
 "Craft Today, Poetry of the Physical", Museum of Art and Design, New York, NY, national tour

1987–90
 "The Eloquent Object", organized by The Philbrook Museum of Art, Tulsa, OK, US and Japan tour

1988
 Concepts Gallery, Carmel and Palo Alto, CA
 "Korean-American Contemporary Metalwork Exhibition 1988", Walker Hill Art Center, Seoul, Korea

1989
 "Mary Lee Hu: Goldsmith", The Merrin Gallery, New York, NY

1989–93
 "Craft Today USA", Museum of Arts and Design, New York, NY and European Tour

1991
 "The 20th Anniversary Show", Electrum Gallery, London, England

1992
 "Design Visions, The Second Australian International Crafts Triennial". Art Gallery of Western Australia
 "Helen Williams Drutt Collection", Helsinki, Finland

1993
 "Documents Northwest: 6 Northwest Jewelers" Seattle Art Museum, Seattle, WA

1993–96
 "Sculptural Concerns: Contemporary American Metalworking",Fort Wayne Museum of Art, national tour

1994
 "Mary Lee Hu: Master Metalsmith", National Ornamental Metal Museum, Memphis, TN

1997
 "Celebrating American Craft", Kunstindustrie Museum, Copenhagen, Denmark

2000
 "Curves Revisited", Susan Cummins Gallery, Mill Valley, CA

2001
 "Flet/Braid", Nordjyllands Kunstmuseum, Aalborg, Denmark

2002
 Summer Arts Festival Mirabela Arts Exhibit, Odegaard Undergraduate Library, University of Washington
 "Exuberance", Facere Jewelry Art Gallery, Seattle (with Kevin Glenn Crane)

2003
 "The Art of Gold" organized by the Society of North American Goldsmiths and tours by Exhibits USA Crocker Art Museum

2004
 "The Art of Gold"
The Arkansas Art Center, Little Rock, AR
The Mint Museum of Art, Charlotte, NC
Anchorage Museum of History and Art, Anchorage, AK
"Korean & American Metalsmithing Exhibition", Kepco Plaza Gallery, Seoul, Korea.

References

Flintridge Foundation, Mary Lee Hu, Seattle, WA, jewelry
Artist Mary Lee Hu at Facere Jewelry Art Gallery
Professional Jewelers Magazine, Innovators 8: Mary Lee Hu
Biography: Mary Lee Hu

External links
 American Craft Council
 World Crafts Council
 Artist Trust of Washington
 The Archives of American Art
 Flintridge Foundation
 Facere Jewelry Art Gallery
 Jewellery Designers Association
 Goldsmith Hall

American goldsmiths
Southern Illinois University alumni
Cranbrook Academy of Art alumni
University of Washington faculty
Michigan State University faculty
University of Wisconsin–Madison faculty
Kansas State University faculty
University of Iowa faculty
Southern Illinois University faculty
1943 births
Living people
People from Lakewood, Ohio
Artists from Ohio
20th-century American women artists
Women metalsmiths
American women academics